Besart Ibraimi (Macedonian: Бесарт Ибраими; born 17 December 1986) is a Macedonian professional footballer who plays as a striker for Struga.

Early life
Born in Kičevo, SFR Yugoslavia to Albanian parents. he is Macedonian by nationality. Ibraimi began playing football in his hometown Kičevo for the youth of FK Vëllazërimi.

Club career
Ibraimi began his professional career 2005 with FK Vëllazërimi, earning 32 caps and scoring 11 goals, before joining FK Napredok in January 2007. He played for FK Napredok for one season, 2007–08, playing 43 games and scoring 19 goals. In September 2008, he signed for FK Renova. He left Macedonia and his club FK Renova on 12 January 2010 for German Bundesliga club FC Schalke 04.  He made his Schalke debut on 6 February 2010 in an away game against SC Freiburg coming on in the 77th minute as a substitute.

Ibraimi only made six appearances for the first team of Schalke 04 before he was transferred to the Schalke 04 II team in the summer of 2010. Ibraimi could participate in training with Schalke 04 II but since he is a non EU player, he could not play in league games for Schalke 04 II. After a half year, he signed on 26 January 2011 with the Ukrainian club PFK Sevastopol.

In January 2014, Ibraimi ended his contract with PFK Sevastopol and joined the Cypriot club Enosis Paralimini. After showing his impressive qualities in Enosis Paralimini all "the elite" clubs in Cypriot First Division ran after Besart Ibraimi, he finally decided to move to Ermis Aradippou where he signed a contract for one year. He made his debut with Ermis Aradippou on 1 September 2014, in the 56th minute of the match against Apollon Limassol.

International career
Ibraimi chose Macedonia over Albania because, according to him, Macedonia is much more important. He did not and did not want to have anything to do with Albania.
Ibraimi is a former member of the U-21 team. He made his senior debut for Macedonia in a September 2009 FIFA World Cup qualification match away against Scotland and has earned a total of 15 caps, scoring no goals.

Honours
Shkëndija
Macedonian First Football League: 2017–18, 2018–19
Macedonian Football Cup: 2015–16, 2017–18

Individual
Macedonian Footballer of the Year: 2009, 2016

Top Goal scorer
20/21	Prva Makedonska Fudbalska Liga - 24 Goals
17/18	Prva Makedonska Fudbalska Liga - 22 Goals
16/17	Prva Makedonska Fudbalska Liga - 20 Goals
15/16	Prva Makedonska Fudbalska Liga - 25 Goals

References

External links
Profile at MacedonianFootball.com 

1986 births
Living people
People from Kičevo
Albanian footballers from North Macedonia
Association football forwards
Macedonian footballers
North Macedonia international footballers
FK Vëllazërimi 77 players
FK Napredok players
FK Renova players
FC Schalke 04 players
FC Schalke 04 II players
FC Sevastopol players
SC Tavriya Simferopol players
FC Metalurh Zaporizhzhia players
Enosis Neon Paralimni FC players
Ermis Aradippou FC players
KF Shkëndija players
Macedonian First Football League players
Bundesliga players
Ukrainian Premier League players
Ukrainian First League players
Cypriot First Division players
Macedonian expatriate footballers
Expatriate footballers in Germany
Expatriate footballers in Ukraine
Expatriate footballers in Cyprus
Macedonian expatriate sportspeople in Germany
Macedonian expatriate sportspeople in Ukraine
Macedonian expatriate sportspeople in Cyprus
Xanthi F.C. players